Leistus fulvibarbis is a species of ground beetle of the subfamily of Nebriinae. Nominative subspecies is distributed in Europe, Asia Minor and North Africa; L. f. danieli found in Italy. They live in forests, bushes, trees and woodlands. Body length of an adult: . Beetle is black colored, with blue metallic shiny elytra. Appendages are reddish-yellow.

References

Nebriinae
Beetles of Europe
Beetles of Asia
Beetles described in 1826